Purlovia is an extinct genus of herbivorous therocephalian therapsids from the Late Permian of Russia. Together with the closely related South African genus Nanictidops, it is a member of the family Nanictidopidae. Fossils have been found from the Tonshayevsky District of Nizhny Novgorod Oblast. The type species of Purlovia, P. maxima, was named in 2011.

In comparison to other therocephalians, Purlovia has a very wide skull due to a widened temporal region. Viewed from above, it looks roughly triangular. It has large canine teeth and smaller buccal, or cheek teeth, along the thick upper and lower jaws. The lower jaw is robust and curved upward, with a well-developed symphyseal region where the two halves of the jaw meet.

References

Extinct animals of Russia
Fossil taxa described in 2011
Eutherocephalians
Lopingian synapsids of Europe
Therocephalia genera